General elections were held in Malta between 9 and 14 January 1865.

Background
The elections were held under the 1849 constitution, which provided for an 18-member Government Council, of which ten members would be appointed and eight elected.

Results
A total of 2,685 people were registered to vote, of which 2,329 cast votes, giving a turnout of 87%.

References

General elections in Malta
Malta
1865 in Malta
January 1865 events